The Supreme Court of India is the supreme judicial authority of India and the highest court of the Republic of India under the constitution. It is the highest constitutional court and has the final decision in all legal matters pertaining to common law which excludes legal authority over personal laws. It also has the power of judicial review. The Chief Justice of India is the Head of the Supreme Court, which consists of a maximum of 34 judges, and has extensive powers in the form of original, appellate and advisory jurisdictions.

As the apex and most powerful constitutional court in India, it takes up appeals primarily against verdicts of the High Courts of various states of the Union and other courts and tribunals and opinions about everything under the sun.

The law declared by the Supreme Court becomes binding on all courts at all levels within India and also on the Union and State Governments. As per the Article 142 of the Constitution, the court is conferred with the inherent jurisdiction to pass any order deemed necessary in the interest of justice. The Supreme Court has replaced the Judicial Committee of the Privy Council as the highest court of appeal since 28 January 1950.

With the Indian Constitution granting it far-reaching authority to initiate actions, to exercise direct appellate authority over all other courts in the country and with the power to review constitutional amendments, India's Supreme Court is regarded as one of the most powerful supreme courts in the world.

History 

In 1861, the Indian High Courts Act 1861 was enacted to create high courts for various provinces and abolished Supreme Courts at Calcutta, Madras and Bombay and also the sadar adalats in presidency towns in their respective regions. These new high courts had the distinction of being the highest courts for all cases till the creation of the Federal Court of India under the Government of India Act 1935. The Federal Court had jurisdiction to solve disputes between provinces and federal states and hear appeals against judgement of the high courts. The first CJI of India was H. J. Kania.

The Supreme Court of India came into being on 28 January 1950. It replaced both the Federal Court of India and the Judicial Committee of the Privy Council which were then at the apex of the Indian court system. The first proceedings and inauguration, however, took place on 28 January 1950 at 9:45 am, when the judges took their seats. Which is thus regarded as the official date of establishment.

The Supreme Court initially had its seat at the Chamber of Princes in the parliament building where the previous Federal Court of India sat from 1937 to 1950. The first Chief Justice of India was H. J. Kania. In 1958, the Supreme Court moved to its present premises. Originally, the Constitution of India envisaged a supreme court with a chief justice and seven judges; leaving it to Parliament to increase this number. In formative years, the Supreme Court met from 10 to 12 in the morning and then 2 to 4 in the afternoon for 28 days in a month.

The emblem of the Supreme Court represent the Lion capital of Ashoka at Sarnath, with a topmost wheel featuring 32 spokes.

Jurisdiction of the Supreme Court 
The Supreme Court of India was constituted as per Chapter IV of the Part V of Constitution of India. The fourth Chapter of the Indian Constitution is " The Union Judiciary". Under this Chapter, the Supreme Court of India is vested with all Jurisdiction. As per Article 124, The Supreme Court of India had been Constituted and Established. As per Article 129, the Supreme Court is to be the Court of Record. As per Article 131, the Original Jurisdiction of the Supreme Court is authorized. As per Articles 132, 133, 134 the Appellate Jurisdiction of the Supreme Court is authorized. Under Article 135, Federal Court's Power is given to the Supreme Court. Article 136 is dealing with the Special leave to Appeal to the Supreme Court. Review Power of the Supreme Court is explained in Article 137. Article 138 deals with the Enlargement of the jurisdiction of the Supreme Court. Article 139 deals with the Conferment on the Supreme Court of powers to issue certain writs. Ancillary powers of Supreme Court is given as per Article 140.

The Law making power of the Supreme Court is given under Article 141 of the Constitution. The law declared by the Supreme Court is binding on all courts in the country.

Members of Collegium

Presently, the Members of Collegium are:
Chief Justice Dhananjaya Y. Chandrachud
Justice Sanjay Kishan Kaul
Justice K. M. Joseph
Justice Mukesh Shah
Justice Ajay Rastogi
Justice Sanjiv Khanna

Court building architecture 

The building is shaped to symbolize scales of justice with its centre-beam being the Central Wing of the building, consisting of the Chief Justice's court, the largest of the courtrooms, with two court halls on either side. The Right Wing of the structure has the Bar, consisting of rooms, the offices of the Attorney General of India and other law officers and the library of the court. The Left Wing has the offices of the court. In all, there are 15 courtrooms in the various wings of the building.

The foundation stone of the Supreme Court's building was laid on 29 October 1954 by Dr. Rajendra Prasad, the first President of India. The main block of the building has been built on a triangular plot of 17 acres and has been designed in an Indo-British style by the chief architect Ganesh Bhikaji Deolalikar, the first Indian to head the Central Public Works Department. The court moved into the building in 1958. In 1979, two new wingsthe East Wing and the West Wingwere added to the complex. 1994 saw the last extension.

Mother and Child Sculpture 

On 20 February 1980, a black bronze sculpture of  height was installed in the lawn of the Supreme Court. It portrays Mother India in the form of the figure of a lady, sheltering the young Republic of India represented by the symbol of a child, who is upholding the laws of land symbolically shown in the form of an open book. On the book, a balance beam is shown, which represents dispensation of equal justice to all. The sculpture was made by the renowned artist Chintamoni Kar. The sculpture is just behind the statue of Mahatma Gandhi.

Seal 

The design of the Court's seal is reproduced from the wheel that appears on the Sarnath Lion capital of Ashoka with 24 spokes. The inscription in Sanskrit, यतो धर्मस्ततो जयः IAST: , means "whence justice (dharma), thence victory". It is also referred as the wheel of righteousness, encompassing truth, goodness and equity.

Constitution of the Court

Registry 

The registry of the Supreme Court is headed by the Secretary-General who is currently assisted by 10 registrars, several additional and deputy registrars, etc. Article 146 of the Constitution deals with the appointments of officers and servants of the Supreme Court registry.

Supreme Court advocates 

Supreme Court Rules, 2013 entitle only those advocates who are registered with the Supreme Court, called advocates-on-record to appear, act and plead for a party in the court. Those advocates who are designated as 'senior advocates' by the Supreme Court or any of the high courts can appear for clients along with an advocate-on-record. Any other advocate can appear for a party along with or under instructions from an advocate-on-record.

Composition

Size of the court 

Initially, the Constitution of India provided for a Supreme Court with a chief justice and 7 judges. In the early years, a full bench of the Supreme Court sat together to hear the cases presented before them. As the work of the Court increased and cases began to accumulate, Parliament increased the number of judges (including the Chief Justice) from the original 8 in 1950 to 11 in 1956, 14 in 1960, 18 in 1978, 26 in 1986, 31 in 2009, to 34 in 2019. As the number of the judges has increased, they sit in smaller benches of two or three (referred to as a division bench)—coming together in larger benches of five or more (referred to as a constitution bench) when required to settle fundamental questions of law. A bench may refer a case before it to a larger bench, should the need arise.

The largest-ever bench at the Supreme Court of India has been constituted in 1973 in Kesavananda Bharati v. State of Kerala. A bench of 13 judges was set up to decide whether Parliament had the unfettered right to amend the Constitution or not that eventually gave rise to the Basic Structure doctrine.

Eligibility of a judge of the Supreme Court 

A citizen of India not exceeding 65 years age per Article 124 of the Constitution who has been:

 a judge of one high court or more (continuously), for at least five years,
 an advocate there, for at least ten years,
 a distinguished jurist, in the opinion of the president, power conferred by clause 2 of article 124 of the Constitution of India

is eligible to be recommended for appointment, a judge of the Supreme Court.

Court demographics 

In practice, judges of the Supreme Court have been selected so far, mostly from amongst judges of the high courts. Barely nine justices—S. M. Sikri, S. Chandra Roy, Kuldip Singh, Santosh Hegde, R. F. Nariman, U. U. Lalit, L. Nageswara Rao, Indu Malhotra and P. S. Narasimha—have been appointed to the Supreme Court directly from the bar (i.e., who were practising advocates).

The Supreme Court saw its first woman judge when Justice M. Fathima Beevi was sworn into office in 1989.

In 1968, Justice Mohammad Hidayatullah became the first Muslim Chief Justice of India. In 2007, Justice K. G. Balakrishnan became the first judge as well as the Chief Justice of India from the dalit community. In 2010, Justice S. H. Kapadia coming from a Parsi minority community became the Chief Justice of India. In 2017, Justice Jagdish Singh Khehar became the first Sikh Chief Justice of India. Justice Indu Malhotra is the first and only woman judge to be selected directly from the bar.

Judicial independence 

The Constitution seeks to ensure the independence of Supreme Court judges in various ways. Per Article 50 of directive principles of state policy, the state shall take steps to separate the judiciary from the executive. Independence of the judiciary, the supremacy of the constitution and rule of law are the features of the basic structure of the Constitution.

The Supreme Court and high courts are empowered to frame suo moto cases without receiving the formal petitions/complaints on any suspected injustice including actions/acts indulging in contempt of court and contempt of the Constitution by the executive, legislators, citizens, etc. It is considered one of the most independent courts in the whole South East Asia.

The main purpose of the Supreme Court is to decide constitutional issues. It is the duty of the judiciary to frame suo moto cases or to probe the cases/petitions at the earliest against the executive or legislature when laws are implemented violating the basic foundation and basic structure of the Constitution as the Article 38 (1) of directive principles ensures that the state/judiciary shall strive to promote the welfare of the people by securing a social order in which social, economic and political justice is animated/informed in all institutions of life.

B. R. Ambedkar clarified as given below in the Constituent Assembly debates on Article 38 (1) high lighting its inevitable implementation.

Appointments and the collegium 

As per the constitution, as held by the court in the Three Judges Cases – (1982, 1993, 1998), a judge is appointed to the Supreme Court by the president on the recommendation of the collegium  — a group of the Chief Justice of India, the four most senior judges of the court and the senior-most judge hailing from the high court of a prospective appointee. This has resulted in a Memorandum of Procedure being followed, for the appointments.

In 2015, Parliament passed a law to replace the collegium with a National Judicial Appointments Commission (NJAC). This was struck down as unconstitutional by the Supreme Court, in the Fourth Judges' Case, as the new system would undermine the independence of the judiciary. Putting the old system of the collegium back, the court invited suggestions, even from the general public, on how to improve the collegium system, broadly along the lines ofsetting up an eligibility criteria for appointments, a permanent secretariat to help the collegium sift through material on potential candidates, infusing more transparency into the selection process, grievance redressal and any other suggestion not in these four categories, like transfer of judges. This resulted in the court asking the government and the collegium to finalize the memorandum of procedure incorporating the above.

In 2009, the recommendation for the appointment of a judge of a high court made by the collegium of that court, had come to be challenged in the Supreme Court. The court held that who could become a judge was a matter of fact, and any person had a right to question it. But who should become a judge was a matter of opinion and could not be questioned. As long as an effective consultation took place within a collegium in arriving at that opinion, the content or material placed before it to form the opinion could not be called for scrutiny in court.

Tenure 

Supreme Court judges retire at the age of 65. However, there have been suggestions from the judges of the Supreme Court of India to provide for a fixed term for the judges including the Chief Justice of India.

Salary 

Article 125 of the Indian constitution leaves it to the Indian parliament to determine the salary, other allowances, leave of absence, pension, etc. of the Supreme Court judges. However, the parliament cannot alter any of these privileges rights to the judge's disadvantage after his/her appointment.

Oath or affirmation

Per Article 124 and third Schedule of the constitution, the chief justice (or a judge) of the Supreme Court of India is required to make and subscribe in the presence of the president an oath or affirmation that they

Removal

Article 124(4) of the constitution, President can remove a judge on proved misbehaviour or incapacity when parliament approves with a majority of the total membership of each house in favour of impeachment and not less than two thirds of the members of each house present. For initiating impeachment proceedings against a judge, at least 50 members of Rajya Sabha or 100 members of Lok Sabha shall issue the notice per Judges (Inquiry) Act, 1968. Then a judicial committee would be formed to frame charges against the judge, to conduct the fair trial and to submit its report to parliament. When the judicial committee report finds the judge guilty of misbehaviour or incapacity, further removal proceedings would be taken up by Parliament if the judge is not resigning himself.

The judge upon proven guilty is also liable for punishment per applicable laws or for contempt of the constitution by breaching the oath under disrespecting constitution

Post-retirement 

A person who has retired as a judge of the Supreme Court is debarred from practicing in any court of law or before any other authority in India. However, Supreme Court and high court judges are appointed to various posts in tribunals and commissions, after their retirement. Lawyer Ashish Goel in a recent article criticized this stating that post-retirement benefits for judges hampers judicial independence. Former Law Minister and Senior Advocate of the Supreme Court, Arun Jaitley, also criticized the appointment of judges in government posts after their retirement. Jaitley famously said:"There are two kinds of judges - those who know the law and those who know the Law Minister. We are the only country in the world where judges appoint judges. Even though there is a retirement age, judges are not willing to retire. Pre-retirement judgements are influenced by post-retirement jobs."

Review petition 

Article 137 of the Constitution of India lays down provision for the power of the Supreme Court to review its own judgements. Per this Article, subject to the provisions of any law made by parliament or any rules made under Article 145, the Supreme Court shall have power to review any judgment pronounced or order made by it. The Supreme Court can nullify any decision of parliament and government on the basis of violation of basic features. It can overrule the impeachment process of the President and Judges which is passed by the parliament on the basis of constitutional validity or basic features.

Under Order XL of the Supreme Court Rules, that have been framed under its powers under Article 145 of the constitution, the Supreme Court may review its judgment or order but no application for review is to be entertained in a civil proceeding except on the grounds mentioned in Order XLVII, Rule 1 of the Code of Civil Procedure.

Powers to punish for contempt 

Under Articles 129 and 142 of the Constitution, the Supreme Court has been vested with power to punish anyone for contempt of any court in India including itself. The Supreme Court performed an unprecedented action when it directed a sitting Minister of State in Maharashtra government, Swaroop Singh Naik, to be jailed for 1-month on a charge of contempt of court on 12 May 2006.

Rules 

Article 145 of the Constitution of India empowers the Supreme Court to frame its own rules (with Presidential approval) for regulating court practice and procedures. Three versions of the rules have been published: the first in 1950, then in 1966 and 2013.

Roster system 

The Supreme Court decided to follow a new roster system from 5 February 2018 for allocation of matters to judges. Under the new roster system, the CJI will hear all special leave petitions (SLPs), and matters related to public interest, social justice, elections, arbitration, and criminal matters, among others. The other collegium/senior judges to hear matters related to labour disputes, taxation matters, compensation matters, consumer protection matters, maritime law matters, mortgage matters, personal law matters, family law matters, land acquisition matters, service matters, company matters etc.

Reporting and citation 

Supreme Court Reports is the official journal of reportable Supreme Court decisions. It is published under the authority of the Supreme Court of India by the Controller of Publications, Government of India, Delhi. In addition, there are many other reputed private journals that report Supreme Court decisions. Some of these other important journals are: SCR (The Supreme Court Reports), SCC (Supreme Court Cases), AIR (All India Reporter), SCALE, etc.

Facilities in the campus 

Legal-aid, court-fee vendors, first-aid post, dental clinic, physiotherapy unit and pathology lab; rail-reservation counter, canteen, post office and a branch and 3 ATMs of UCO Bank, Supreme Court Museum can be availed by litigants and visitors.

Landmark judgments

Land reform 

After some of the courts overturned state laws for redistributing land from zamindar (landlord) estates on the ground that the laws violated the zamindars' fundamental rights, Parliament passed the 1st amendment to the constitution in 1951, followed by the 4th amendment in 1955, to uphold its authority to redistribute land. The Supreme Court countered these amendments in 1967 when it ruled in Golaknath v. State of Punjab that Parliament did not have the power to abrogate fundamental rights, including the provisions on private property. The 25th amendment to the constitution in 1971 curtailed the right of a citizen to property as a fundamental right and gave authority to the government to infringe private property, which led to a furor amongst the zamindars.

During the Emergency (1975–1977) 

The independence of the judiciary was severely curtailed during the Indian Emergency (1975–1977) of Indira Gandhi. The constitutional rights of imprisoned persons were restricted under preventive detention laws passed by Parliament. In the case of Shiva Kant Shukla (Additional District Magistrate of Jabalpur v. Shiv Kant Shukla), popularly known as the Habeas Corpus case, a bench of five senior-most judges of the Supreme Court ruled in favour of the state's right to unrestricted powers of detention during the emergency. Justices A.N. Ray, P. N. Bhagwati, Y. V. Chandrachud, and M.H. Beg, stated in the majority decision:
(under the declaration of emergency) no person has any locus to move any writ petition under Art. 226 before a High Court for habeas corpus or any other writ or order or direction to challenge the legality of an order of detention.
The only dissenting opinion was from Justice H. R. Khanna, who stated:
detention without trial is an anathema to all those who love personal liberty... A dissent is an appeal to the brooding spirit of the law, to the intelligence of a future day, when a later decision may possibly correct the error into which the dissenting judge believes the court to have been betrayed.

It is believed that before delivering his dissenting opinion, Justice Khanna had mentioned to his sister: "I have prepared my judgment, which is going to cost me the Chief Justice-ship of India." In January 1977, Justice Khanna was superseded despite being the most senior judge at the time and thereby the government broke the convention of appointing only the seniormost judge to the position of Chief Justice of India. Justice Khanna remains a legendary figure among the legal fraternity in India for this decision.

The New York Times wrote of this opinion: "The submission of an independent judiciary to absolutist government is virtually the last step in the destruction of a democratic society; and the Indian supreme court's decision appears close to utter surrender."

During the emergency period, the government also passed the 39th amendment, which sought to limit judicial review for the election of the prime minister; only a body constituted by parliament could review this election. Subsequently, Parliament, with most opposition members in jail during the emergency, passed the 42nd Amendment which prevented any court from reviewing any amendment to the constitution with the exception of procedural issues concerning ratification. A few years after the emergency, however, the Supreme Court rejected the absoluteness of the 42nd amendment and reaffirmed its power of judicial review in Minerva Mills v. Union of India (1980).

Post-1980: an assertive court 

After Indira Gandhi lost elections in 1977, the new government of Morarji Desai, and especially law minister Shanti Bhushan (who had earlier argued for the detenues in the Habeas Corpus case), introduced a number of amendments making it more difficult to declare and sustain an emergency, and reinstated much of the power to the Supreme Court. It is said that the basic structure doctrine, created in Kesavananda Bharati v. State of Kerala, was strengthened in Indira Gandhi's case and set in stone in Minerva Mills v. Union of India.

The Supreme Court's creative and expansive interpretations of Article 21 (Life and Personal Liberty), primarily after the Emergency period, have given rise to a new jurisprudence of public interest litigation that has vigorously promoted many important economic and social rights (constitutionally protected but not enforceable) including, but not restricted to, the rights to free education, livelihood, a clean environment, food and many others. Civil and political rights (traditionally protected in the Fundamental Rights chapter of the Indian constitution) have also been expanded and more fiercely protected. These new interpretations have opened the avenue for litigation on a number of important issues.

Since 2000 

Among the important pronouncements of the Supreme Court post 2000 is the Coelho case I.R. Coelho v. State of Tamil Nadu (Judgment of 11 January 2007). A unanimous bench of 9 judges reaffirmed the basic structure doctrine. It held that a constitutional amendment which entails violation of any fundamental rights which the court regards as forming part of the basic structure of the constitution can be struck down depending upon its impact and consequences. The judgment clearly imposes further limitations on the constituent power of Parliament with respect to the principles underlying certain fundamental rights. The judgment in Coelho has in effect restored the decision in Golaknath case regarding non-amendability of the constitution on account of infraction of fundamental rights, contrary to the judgment in the Kesavananda Bharati case.

Another important decision was of the five-judge bench in Ashoka Kumar Thakur v. Union of India; where the constitutional validity of Central Educational Institutions (Reservations in Admissions) Act, 2006 was upheld, subject to the "creamy layer" criteria. Importantly, the court refused to follow the 'strict scrutiny' standards of review followed by the United States Supreme Court. At the same time, the court has applied the strict scrutiny standards in Anuj Garg v. Hotel Association of India (2007) (Beyond Reasonableness - A Rigorous Standard of Review for Article 15 Infringement)a

2G spectrum case 

The Supreme Court declared allotment of spectrum as "unconstitutional and arbitrary" and quashed all the 122 licenses issued in 2008 during tenure of A. Raja (then Minister for communications & IT), the main official accused in the 2G case.

Right to Information 

In the year 2010, the Supreme Court filed an appeal before itself challenging the judgement of the Delhi high court holding that the office of the chief justice of India came under the ambit of the RTI Act and was liable to reveal information under it. Though the Supreme Court is in favour of bringing CJI office under RTI act, in 13-11-2019 the chief Justice of India office was brought under RTI Act by a majority judgement.

Black money 

The government refused to disclose details of about 18 Indians holding accounts in LGT Bank, Liechtenstein, evoking a sharp response from a bench comprising justices B Sudershan Reddy and S S Nijjar. The court ordered the Special investigation team (SIT) to probe the matter. Lack of enthusiasm made the court create a special investigative team (SIT).

Minority reservations 

The Supreme Court upheld the Andhra Pradesh High Court judgement quashing 4.5% sub-quota for minorities under OBC reservation quota of 27%.

Online/postal ballot for Indian citizen living abroad (NRIs) 

Three judge bench presided by the then Chief Justice of India Altamas Kabir issued notice to the Union government and the Election Commission of India (EC) on the PIL filed by a group of NRIs for online/postal ballot for the Indian citizens living abroad.

T. S. R. Subramanian vs. Union of India 

While hearing T.S.R. Subramanian vs Union of India, a division bench of the Supreme Court ruled that
 Officers of the Indian Administrative Service (IAS), officers other All India Services, and other civil servants were not required to follow oral instructions, as they 'undermine credibility'.
 A Civil Services Board (CSB), headed by the Cabinet Secretary at national level, and Chief Secretary at state level, be set up to recommend transfer/postings of the officers of the All India Services (IAS, IFoS and IPS).
 Transfers of Group 'B' officers were to be done by the Heads of Departments (HoDs).
 There was to be no interference of Ministers in state, other than the Chief Minister, in transfers/postings of civil servants.
These rulings were received mostly positively, and were termed as 'major reform(s)'.

Recognition of transgender as 'third gender' in law 

In April 2014, Justice K. S. Radhakrishnan declared transgender to be the 'third gender' in Indian law, in the case, National Legal Services Authority v. Union of India. The ruling said:

Seldom, our society realises or cares to realise the trauma, agony and pain which the members of Transgender community undergo, nor appreciates the innate feelings of the members of the Transgender community, especially of those whose mind and body disown their biological sex. Our society often ridicules and abuses the Transgender community and in public places like railway stations, bus stands, schools, workplaces, malls, theatres [and] hospitals; they are sidelined and treated as untouchables, forgetting the fact that the moral failure lies in the society's unwillingness to contain or embrace different gender identities and expressions, a mindset which we have to change.

Justice Radhakrishnan said that transgender people should be treated consistently with other minorities under the law, enabling them to access jobs, healthcare and education. He framed the issue as one of human rights, saying that, "These TGs, even though insignificant in numbers, are still human beings, and therefore, they have every right to enjoy their human rights," concluding by declaring that:

(1) Hijras, eunuchs, apart from binary gender, were to be treated as "third gender" for the purpose of safeguarding their rights under Part III of the Indian Constitution and the laws made by Parliament and the State Legislatures.

(2) Transgender persons' right to decide their self-identified gender was to be upheld and that the Union and State Governments were to grant legal recognition of their gender identity such as male, female or as third gender.

Relief to over 35,000 public servants 

In B.Prabhakara Rao vs. State of A.P. involved sudden reduction in age of superannuation from 58 years to 55 years of over 35,000 public servants of State Government, public sector undertakings, statutory bodies, educational institutions and Tirupathi-Tirumalai Devasthanams (TTD). They lost first round of litigation in the Supreme Court. Realizing the mistake, fresh legislation was brought restoring the original age of superannuation of 58 years but providing that the benefit of new legislation would not extend to those whose reduction of age of superannuation had been upheld. In challenge to this law, Subodh Markandeya argued that all that was required was to strike down naughty "not" – which found favour with the Supreme Court bringing relief to over 35,000 public servants.

Decriminalisation of homosexuality 

On 6 September 2018, a five-member constitutional bench decriminalised homosexuality by partially striking down Section 377 of the Indian Penal Code in the case Navtej Singh Johar v. Union of India. The bench led by Dipak Misra unanimously declared that criminalisation of private consensual sex between adult persons of the same sex under Section 377 of the Indian Penal Code was clearly unconstitutional. The court, however, held that the section would apply to bestiality, sex with minors and non consensual sexual acts.

Ayodhya dispute 

A political, historical, and socio-religious debate, the Ayodhya dispute has been going on since 1961 when the first case was filed in court. The Supreme Court, after a marathon 40 day hearing which concluded on 16 October, reserved the decision and revealed it on 9 November 2019 stating that the disputed land will be given to Hindus and also ruled that the Muslim community will be given an alternative piece of 5 acre land for the construction of a mosque. This was one of the biggest decisions before the retirement of then Chief Justice of India, Ranjan Gogoi on 17 November 2019.

Critical assessment

Corruption 

The year 2008 saw the Supreme Court embroiled in several controversies, from serious allegations of corruption at the highest level of the judiciary, expensive private holidays at the tax payers expense, refusal to divulge details of judges' assets to the public, secrecy in the appointments of judges', to refusal to make information public under the Right to Information Act. The chief justice K. G. Balakrishnan invited a lot of criticism for his comments on his post not being that of a public servant, but that of a constitutional authority. He later went back on this stand. The judiciary has come in for serious criticisms from former presidents Pratibha Patil and A. P. J. Abdul Kalam for failure in handling its duties. Former prime minister Manmohan Singh, has stated that corruption is one of the major challenges facing the judiciary, and suggested that there is an urgent need to eradicate this menace.

The Cabinet Secretary of India introduced the judges Inquiry (Amendment) Bill 2008 in parliament for setting up of a panel called the National Judicial Council, headed by the Chief Justice of India, that will probe into allegations of corruption and misconduct by High Court and Supreme Court judges.

Pending cases 
Related Article: Pendency of court cases in India

According to Supreme Court newsletter, there are 58,519 cases pending in the Supreme Court, out of which 37,385 are pending for more than a year, at the end of 2011. Excluding connected cases, there are still 33,892 pending cases. Per the latest pendency data made available by the Supreme Court, the total number of pending cases in the Supreme Court as on 1 November 2017 is 55,259 which includes 32,160 admission matters (miscellaneous) and 23,099 regular hearing matters. In May, 2014, former Chief Justice of India, Justice R.M. Lodha, proposed to make Indian judiciary work throughout the year (instead of the present system of having long vacations, specially in the higher courts) in order to reduce pendency of cases in Indian courts; however, per this proposal there is not going to be any increase in the number of working days or working hours of any of the judges and it only meant that different judges would be going on vacation during different periods of the year per their choice; but, the Bar Council of India rejected this proposal mainly because it would have inconvenienced the advocates who would have to work throughout the year. More over, various time frames specified in 'code of civil procedure' are also diluted by Supreme Court judgements to give the courts right to endlessly adjourn the cases.

Rule of law 

The Supreme Court has not taken up the trial of many pending cases, since April 2014 (more than 6 years), challenging the validity of the Andhra Pradesh Reorganisation Act, 2014 which was enacted by the Parliament without following the stipulated procedure in the Constitution and is claimed detrimental to the basic foundation of the constitution on which the basic structure of the constitution is resting. The basic foundation of the constitution is the dignity and the freedom of its citizens which is of supreme importance and can not be destroyed by any legislation of the parliament. Whereas the fair trial to examine the validity of the ninety-ninth constitutional amendment dated 31 December 2014, to form National Judicial Appointments Commission for the purpose of appointing the judges of the Supreme Court and high courts, was conducted on utmost priority and the Supreme Court delivered its judgement on 16 October 2015 (within a year) quashing the constitutional amendment as unconstitutional and ultra vires stating the said amendment is interfering with the independence of the judiciary. Disposal of the various petitions filed against Andhra Pradesh Reorganisation Act, 2014 is also equally important as it has alienated the basic rights of a vast section of Indian citizens and also against federal character of the constitution which is part of the basic structure of the constitution. The Supreme Court is also wasting its valuable time by not taking up the case in toto but conducted a piecemeal trial by delivering its judgement to dispose the petitions related with apportionment of assets between the newly formed states Telangana and Andhra Pradesh. The Supreme Court is also conducting piecemeal trial of the petitions filed by the states regarding water sharing of rivers and bifurcation of the common high court without considering the earlier pending petitions challenging the validity of the Andhra Pradesh Reorganisation Act, 2014 which is the basic cause of all these disputes. Under checks and balances as provided in the Constitution, it is the duty of the judiciary/Supreme Court to establish the rule of law at the earliest by rectifying any misuse of the Constitution by Parliament and the executive without colluding with them and to remove perceptions of people that rule of law is side lined and a section of its citizens are subjected to discrimination.

Four judges vs chief justice 

On 12 January 2018, four senior judges of the Supreme Court; Jasti Chelameswar, Ranjan Gogoi, Madan Lokur and Kurian Joseph addressed a press conference criticizing Chief Justice Dipak Misra's style of administration and the manner in which he allocated cases among judges of the Supreme Court. However, people close to Misra denied the allegations that allocation of cases was unfair. On 20 April 2018, seven opposition parties submitted a petition seeking impeachment of Dipak Misra to the Vice President Venkaiah Naidu, with signatures from seventy-one parliamentarians. On 23 April 2018, the petition was rejected by Vice President Venkaiah Naidu, primarily on the basis that the complaints were about administration and not misbehaviour, and that thus impeachment would seriously interfere with the constitutionally protected independence of the judiciary.

Holidays and working hours

The Supreme Court works from 10.30 am to 4 pm, but is closed during winter and summer for 2 weeks each. Some critics feel that this delays pending cases. However, in an interview in June 2018 with NDTV, Justice Chelameswar revealed that most Supreme Court judges including him work around 14 hours per day, and continue to work for an average of 7 hours per day even during vacations. He further reminded that the Supreme Court of United States delivers judgement on just 120 cases in a year, while every judge in the Supreme Court of India delivers judgements on 1000-1500 cases.

Appointment 

It has been pointed out that consensus within the Collegium is occasionally resolved through trade-offs, resulting in unreliable appointments with consequences for litigants There has also been growing sycophancy and "lobbying" within the system. Justice Chelameswar gave evidence from existing records to argue this point. In one case, "a judge was blocked from elevation to the Madras High Court in 2009, in what appeared to have been a joint venture in the subversion of the law governing the collegium system by both the executive and the judiciary."

Controversies

On 18 April 2019 an unnamed woman employee of the Supreme Court filed an affidavit stating that the Chief Justice Ranjan Gogoi had sexually harassed her on 10–11 October 2018 by pressing his body against hers against her will. An in-house committee of the Court quickly cleared Gogoi of the sexual harassment charges, although the report of the committee was not provided to the complainant. However, there were widespread protests against the manner in which the woman's complaint was dealt with by Supreme Court. A petition was filed before National Human Rights Commission to obtain the report of the in-house committee. The National Law University topper Survi Karwa skipped her convocation to avoid receiving her degree from Ranjan Gogoi in protest. The in house committee which cleared Gogoi of sexual harassment was chaired by Justice S A Bobde, who himself succeeded Gogoi as chief justice. The woman complainant stated that she was terrified by the systematic victimisation of her family members who were all dismissed from service following her protest against Gogoi's sexual advances.

Dissent 
On 2 January 2023, justice BV Nagarathna said in her dissent that the government notification on demonetisation was "unlawful" and the process of banning all currency notes of ₹ 1,000 and ₹ 500 could not have been initiated by the Indian government. Justice Nagarathna expressed her dissenting views after a Supreme Court Constitution bench, with 4:1 majority, upheld the demonetisation decision by the Narendra Modi government.

See also 

 Attorney General of India
 List of Chief Justices of India
 List of former justices of the Supreme Court of India
 List of sitting judges of the Supreme Court of India
 Solicitor General of India
 Constitutional body (India)
 Pendency of court cases in India

References

External links 

 
 Supreme Court reports
 Text of all Indian Supreme Court judgments
 Chief Justice & Judges 

 
India
India
India
[IPL 2023 Match No 1, Chennai Super Kings (CSK) vs Gujarat Titans (GT) : Dream11 Team, Scorecard, Head-To-Head, Winning Prediction & Match Report]